Tritomini is a tribe of pleasing fungus beetles in the family Erotylidae. There are about 7 genera and at least 30 described species in Tritomini.

Genera
These seven genera belong to the tribe Tritomini:
 Haematochiton Gorham, 1888
 Hirsutotriplax Skelley, 1993
 Ischyrus Lacordaire, 1842
 Mycotretus Lacordaire, 1842
 Pseudischyrus Casey, 1916
 Triplax  Herbst, 1793
 Tritoma Fabricius, 1775

References

Further reading

External links

 

Erotylidae